Rahul Krushna Vaidya (born 23 September 1987) is an Indian singer. He has worked as a playback singer in Bollywood films such as Shaadi No. 1, Jaan-E-Mann and Krazzy 4. He also participated in the reality shows Indian Idol 1, Bigg Boss 14 and Fear Factor: Khatron Ke Khiladi 11.

Early life
Vaidya grew up in Mumbai, where he studied music under Himanshu Manocha

Career 
Vaidya finished third on the first season of Indian Idol, he lost in the penultimate round, on 18 February 2005. Eight months later, he released his debut album Tera Intezar. Sajid–Wajid composed the music for his album. He also sang a duet, "Hello Madam, I am your Adam", with fellow Indian Idol runner-up Prajakta Shukre, and "God Promise Dil Dola" with Shreya Ghoshal for the film Shaadi No. 1. Later he sang for films, such as  Jigyasa, Hot Money and Krazzy 4 and title song of television series Ek Ladki Anjaani Si.

Vaidya was the host of the show Jjhoom India. In 2008, he won the title of Jo Jeeta Wohi Superstar, a reality singing show.

In 2013, Vaidya sung "Be Intehaan" (Unplugged) from Race 2. On the occasion of Independence Day, he released a new song, 'Vande Mataram'. He was the co-host of the dance reality show Aajaa Mahi Vay with Vinit Singh.

Vaidya is a successful contestant of the singing show Music Ka Maha Muqqabla in the team Shankar's Rockstars. His team won, beating Shaan's Strikers in the finale.

In 2020, he participated in Colors TV's reality show Bigg Boss 14, and emerged as the runner-up of the show. In 2021, Vaidya participated in the stunt-based reality show Fear Factor: Khatron Ke Khiladi 11 and became a finalist.

Personal life
Vaidya had been romantically involved with model and actress Disha Parmar. During his stint on Bigg Boss 14, he proposed to her, and the couple tied the knot on July 16, 2022.

In the media 

Vaidya was ranked at No. 16 in the Times of Indias 20 Most Desirable Men on Television in 2020.

Television
{| class="wikitable"
! Year 
! Title 
! Role 
! Notes 
! Ref.
|-
|1997
|Star Yaar Kalakar
| rowspan="5" |Contestant
|Debut 
|
|-
|1997–1998
|Close Up Antakshari
|
|style="text-align:center;" |
|-
|2000
|Aao Jhoomein Gaayen
|
|
|-
| 2001
|Chalti Ka Naam Antakshari
|
|style="text-align:center;" |
|-
| 2004–2005
| Indian Idol 1
| 2nd runner-up
| style="text-align:center;" |
|-
|2007
|Jjhoom India
|Host
|
|style="text-align:center;" |
|-
| rowspan="2" | 2008
| Jo Jeeta Wohi Super Star
|Contestant
|Winner
| style="text-align:center;" |
|-
| Aajaa Mahi Vay
| Host
| 
|
|-
| 2010
| Music Ka Maha Muqqabla
| Contestant
| Winner
|style="text-align:center;" |
|-
|2012
|Ramleela- Ajay Devgn ke Saath
|Voice of Lord Rama 
|Musical Cast
|style="text-align:center;" |
|-
| 2014
| Jhalak Dikhhla Jaa 7
| Contestant
| Not selected
| style="text-align:center;" |
|-
|2015
|Indian Idol Junior 2
| rowspan="2" | Guest
|
| style="text-align:center;" |
|-
| rowspan="2" | 2017
| The Drama Company|
|
|-
| Music Ki Pathshala| Host
| 
| style="text-align:center;" |
|-
| 2020–2021 
| Bigg Boss 14| rowspan="2" | Contestant 
| 1st runner-up
|style="text-align:center;" |
|-
| 2021
|Fear Factor: Khatron Ke Khiladi 11| 6th place 
|style="text-align:center;" |
|}

Guest appearances

Discography

Film songs

 Non-film songs 

Others
 Dilbar Mere (The Unwind Mix – Bollywood Unwind 2)
 Dil Lena Khel Hai Dildar Ka (Bollywood Unwind 4)
 Maine Puchha Chand Se (The Unwind Mix)Ek Pyaar Ka Nagma (Unplugged)Mere Rashqa Qamar (Unplugged)Dil Diyan Gallan'' (EDM Mix)

Awards

References

External links

 Official website
 
 

Bollywood playback singers
Indian male playback singers
Indian male pop singers
Living people
Musicians from Nagpur
Indian Idol participants
Mithibai College alumni
Bigg Boss (Hindi TV series) contestants
Fear Factor: Khatron Ke Khiladi participants
1987 births